Maniktala is a residential area of North Kolkata, in Kolkata district, West Bengal, India.

Etymology
The tomb of Manik Pir is located in lane near Maniktala crossing. Some people say, the neighbourhood is named after Manik Pir.

Others say, Manik pir (erst: Syed Husen Ud din shah)  came from North India on early eighteenth century. But Maniktala, this name is also mentioned in a map of 1784. They say, the bodyguard of Nawab of Bengal Alivardi Khan, Manikchand Bose (erst : Manikram Bose) lived in this place as the caretaker of Calcutta (Ali Nagar) around from 1756. He was a wise, Compassionate man. That's why he was so popular to all people. From Manikchand this area is called Maniktala.

History
In 1889, the suburbs of old Calcutta were grouped in four municipalities. Maniktala formed the East Suburban Municipality. In the same year, Maniktala, Ultadanga and Beliaghata became 'fringe area wards' of Kolkata Municipal Corporation. The Calcutta Municipal Act of 1923 brought about important changes. The adjacent municipalities of Cossipore, Chitpur, Maniktala and Garden Reach were amalgamated with Kolkata. Garden Reach was later taken out.

Geography

Location
Today's Maniktala crossing is the intersection of Vivekananda Road (Maniktala Main Road) and Acharya Prafulla Chandra Road (Upper Circular Road) — two main thoroughfares in North Kolkata. Beadon Street (Dani Ghosh Sarani/Abhedananda Road), one of the important streets of North Kolkata originates from Maniktala, ending in Nimtala Ghat. Amherst Street also starts nearby (Chaltabagan). Aurobindo Sarani crosses APC Road at Khanna crossing, Maniktala.  Maniktala crossing connects Shyambazar, Kankurgachi, Rajabazar and Girish Park to Maniktala.

Police district
Manicktala police station is part of the Eastern Suburban division of Kolkata Police. It is located at 20, Canal West Road, Kolkata-700006.

Ultadanga Women police station covers all police districts under the jurisdiction of the Eastern Suburban division i.e. Beliaghata, Entally, Maniktala, Narkeldanga, Ultadanga, Tangra and Phoolbagan.

Landmarks

The Central Blood Bank of West Bengal Government is located at the Maniktala crossing. So is one of oldest markets of Kolkata, the Maniktala Bazar, easily identified by the clock tower. Gouribari Badridas Jain Temple is also located nearby.

Economy

Daily markets
 
Maniktala market, along with Hatibagan, Sealdah, Lake Market and Gariahat markets, is amongst the largest markets in Kolkata. "The vintage landmark of the clock tower in Maniktala helps to spot the interiors of this market well." Maniktala is famous for its fish market but is also popular for groceries and fresh vegetables. It is one of the best farmer's markets in Kolkata. Maniktala Market at 187, Vivekananda Road is a private market spread over 3 acres. Vegetables, fruits, betel leaf, flowers, fish, meat, egg etc.are available. Maniktala Municipal Market is located at P-187, C.I.T. Road, Kankurgachi. In Kolkata, every para (neighbourhood) has a machher bazar (fish market), but there are some big fish markets in different areas of the city: Howrah wholesale fish market, Gariahat, Sealdah and Maniktala. These markets "are famous not only for the wide variety of fishes they procure but also for their stellar quality. Prices depend on the fish you want. The staple ones are competitively priced. However, the special fishes such as Iilish, Chitol, Chingri can go for some ridiculous pricing. But that's no deterrence for the fish lover who can't do without it in his lunch!" Maniktala market sets a sort of a bench-mark for the pricing.

Transport 

The Maratha Ditch was dug in 1742 and it was partly filled up in 1799 to create the Circular Road (now Acharya Prafulla Chandra Road).

The construction of Vivekananda Road, by Calcutta Improvement Trust, was completed in 1928. It was a broad new road through a congested area and changed the complexion of the area. Many buses and auto-rickshaws ply along these roads.

Electric tramcars were introduced in Calcutta in 1902. Tram lines were laid to Rajabazar in 1910. The line along Upper Circular Road to Galiff Street came in 1941. A new tram line was laid from Maniktala to Ultadanga in 1985. Now Kolkata tram route no. 18 serves Maniktala (via APC Road-Vivekananda Road/Maniktala Main Road).

Culture
One of Kolkata's largest Durga Puja celebration, the Manicktalla Chaltabagan Lohapatty Durga Puja is celebrated in its vicinity.

External links

References 

Tourist attractions in Kolkata
Neighbourhoods in Kolkata